Ragini is a 1968 Indian Malayalam film, directed by P. B. Unni and produced by K. N. Moorhty. The film stars Madhu, K. Balaji, K. R. Vijaya and Sankaradi in the lead roles. The film had musical score by Alleppey Usman.

Cast
Madhu
K. Balaji
K. R. Vijaya
Sankaradi
Adoor Pankajam
Bahadoor
Jyothi

Soundtrack
The music was composed by Alleppey Usman and the lyrics were written by Latha Vaikkam.

References

External links
 

1968 films
1960s Malayalam-language films